Asota carsina is a moth of the family Erebidae first described by Swinhoe in 1906. It is found on Nias.

References

Asota (moth)
Moths of Indonesia
Moths described in 1906